The 2015 São Paulo Challenger de Tênis was a professional tennis tournament played on clay courts. It was the fifth edition of the tournament which was part of the 2015 ATP Challenger Tour. It took place in São Paulo, Brazil between 27 April and 2 May 2015.

Singles main-draw entrants

Seeds

 1 Rankings are as of April 20, 2015.

Other entrants
The following players received wildcards into the singles main draw:
  Rogério Dutra Silva 
  Thiago Monteiro 
  Wilson Leite
  Pedro Sakamoto

The following players received entry from the qualifying draw:
  Federico Coria
  Ricardo Hocevar 
  Tomás Lipovšek Puches
  José Pereira

The following players received entry as a special exempt:
  Orlando Luz

Doubles entrants

Seeds

Other entrants
The following pairs received wildcards into the doubles main draw:
  Rogério Dutra Silva /  André Ghem
  Rodrigo Carvalho /  Diego Padilha
  Felipe Carvalho /  Tiago Lopes

Champions

Singles

  Guido Pella def.  Christian Lindell, 7–5, 7–6(7–1)

Doubles

  Chase Buchanan /  Blaž Rola def.  Guido Andreozzi /  Sergio Galdós, 6–4, 6–4

External links
Official Website

Sao Paulo Challenger de Tenis
São Paulo Challenger de Tênis